Between 1980 and 1982, Norwegian male competitors including Roger Ruud, Per Bergerud and Ole Bremseth  won ski jumping events within the Ski Jumping World Cup.

Men 

{|class="wikitable plainrowheaders" style="background:#fff; font-size:86%; line-height:15px; border:gray solid 1px; border-collapse:collapse;"
|-  style="background:#ccc; text-align:center;"
! scope="col" style="background:#ccc; width:15px;" |No.
! scope="col" style="background:#ccc; width:50px;" |Season
! scope="col" style="background:#ccc; width:120px;"|Date
! scope="col" style="background:#ccc; width:200px;"|Winner
! scope="col" style="background:#ccc; width:180px;"|Location
! scope="col" style="background:#ccc; width:180px;"|Hill
! scope="col" style="background:#ccc; width:30px;" |Size
|-
! scope=row style="text-align:center;"|1
| align=center rowspan=3|1979/80 || align=right|10 February 1980   || Tom Christiansen || Saint-Nizier || Dauphine K117 || align=center|LH
|-
! scope=row style="text-align:center;"|2
| align=right|27 February 1980   || Roger Ruud || St. Moritz || Olympiaschanze K94 || align=center|NH
|-
! scope=row style="text-align:center;"|3
| align=right|2 March 1980   || Per Bergerud || Vikersund || Vikersundbakken K155 || align=center|FH
|-
! scope=row style="text-align:center;"|4
| align=center rowspan=8|1980/81 || align=right|10 January 1981   || Roger Ruud || Harrachov || Čerťák K120 || align=center|LH
|-
! scope=row style="text-align:center;"|5
| align=right|11 January 1981   || Roger Ruud || Liberec || Ještěd K88 || align=center|NH
|-
! scope=row style="text-align:center;"|6
| align=right|23 January 1981   || Johan Sætre || Gstaad || Mattenschanze K88 || align=center|NH
|-
! scope=row style="text-align:center;"|7
| align=right|25 January 1981   || Per Bergerud || Engelberg || Gross-Titlis-Schanze K116 || align=center|LH
|-
! scope=row style="text-align:center;"|8
| align=right|26 February 1981   || Roger Ruud || Chamonix || Le Mont K95 || align=center|NH
|-
! scope=row style="text-align:center;"|9
| align=right|28 February 1981   || Roger Ruud || Saint-Nizier || Dauphine K112 || align=center|LH
|-
! scope=row style="text-align:center;"|10
| align=right|15 March 1981   || Roger Ruud || Oslo || Holmenkollbakken K105 || align=center|LH
|-
! scope=row style="text-align:center;"|11
| align=right|22 March 1981   || Dag Holmen-Jensen || Planica || Bloudkova velikanka K120 || align=center|LH
|-
! scope=row style="text-align:center;"|12
| align=center rowspan=9|1981/82 || align=right|20 December 1981   || Roger Ruud || Cortina d’Ampezzo || Trampolino Olimpico Italia K92 || align=center|NH
|-
! scope=row style="text-align:center;"|13
| align=right|1 January 1982   || Roger Ruud || Garmisch-Partenkirchen || Große Olympiaschanze K107 || align=center|LH
|-
! scope=row style="text-align:center;"|14
| align=right|3 January 1982   || Per Bergerud || Innsbruck || Bergiselschanze K104 || align=center|LH
|-
! scope=row style="text-align:center;"|15
| align=right|4 March 1982   || Ole Bremseth || Lahti || Salpausselkä K88 || align=center|NH
|-
! scope=row style="text-align:center;"|16
| align=right|7 March 1982   || Ole Bremseth || Lahti || Salpausselkä K88 || align=center|NH
|-
! scope=row style="text-align:center;"|17
| align=right|20 March 1982   || Ole Bremseth || Štrbské Pleso || MS 1970 A K110 || align=center|LH
|-
! scope=row style="text-align:center;"|18
| align=right|21 March 1982   || Ole Bremseth || Štrbské Pleso || MS 1970 B K88 || align=center|NH
|-
! scope=row style="text-align:center;"|19
| align=right|27 March 1982   || Ole Bremseth || Planica || Srednja Bloudkova K90 || align=center|NH
|-
! scope=row style="text-align:center;"|20
| align=right|28 March 1982   || Ole Bremseth || Planica || Bloudkova velikanka K120 || align=center|LH
|-

Norwegian
Ski jumping